Friedhelm Waldhausen (born 1938 in Millich, Hückelhoven, Rhine Province) is a German mathematician known for his work in algebraic topology. He made fundamental contributions in the fields of 3-manifolds and (algebraic) K-theory.

Career

Waldhausen studied mathematics at the universities of Göttingen, Munich and Bonn. He obtained his Ph.D. in 1966 from the University of Bonn; his advisor was Friedrich Hirzebruch and his thesis was entitled "Eine Klasse von 3-dimensionalen Mannigfaltigkeiten" (A class of 3-dimensional manifolds).

After visits to Princeton University, the University of Illinois and the University of Michigan he moved in 1968 to the University of Kiel, where he completed his habilitation (qualified to assume a professorship).

In 1969, he was appointed professor at the Ruhr University Bochum before in 1971 becoming a professor at Bielefeld University, an appointment he held until his retirement in 2004.

Academic work

His early work was mainly on the theory of 3-manifolds. He dealt mainly with Haken manifolds and Heegaard splitting. Among other things, he proved that, roughly speaking, any homotopy equivalence of Haken manifolds is homotopic to a homeomorphism, i.e. that closed Haken manifolds are topologically rigid. He put forward the Waldhausen conjecture about Heegaard splitting.

In the mid-seventies, he extended the connection between geometric topology and algebraic K-theory by introducing A-theory, a kind of algebraic K-theory for topological spaces. This led to new foundations for algebraic K-theory (using what are now called Waldhausen categories) and also gave new impetus to the study of highly structured ring spectra.

Recognition

Today, Waldhausen is seen, together with Daniel Quillen, as one of the pioneers of algebraic K-theory. Among others, he was awarded the von Staudt Prize in 2004 along with Günter Harder, and an honorary doctorate from the Universität Osnabrück.

Important publications

Algebraic -theory of spaces, Algebraic and
geometric topology (New Brunswick, N.J., 1983), 318–419, Lecture Notes
in Math., 1126, Springer, Berlin, 1985.

Algebraic -theory of spaces, concordance,
and stable homotopy theory, Algebraic topology and algebraic -theory
(Princeton, N.J., 1983), 392–417, Ann.  of Math. Stud., 113, Princeton
Univ. Press, Princeton, NJ, 1987.

(with Marcel Bökstedt) The map ,
Algebraic topology and algebraic -theory (Princeton, N.J., 1983),
418–431, Ann. of Math. Stud., 113, Princeton Univ. Press, Princeton,
NJ, 1987.

See also

Graph manifold
Loop theorem
K-theory of a category
Smith conjecture
Surface subgroup conjecture
Virtually Haken conjecture
History of knot theory
Waldhausen category
Waldhausen S-construction

References

External links 
  at Bielefeld University
 Profile at Zentralblatt MATH: 

1938 births
Living people
People from Heinsberg (district)
People from the Rhine Province
20th-century German mathematicians
University of Michigan staff
Topologists
Academic staff of Bielefeld University
Academic staff of Ruhr University Bochum
21st-century German mathematicians